Nick Rock'n'Roll (real name Nikolay Frantsevich Kuntsevich, ; born 7 August 1960 in Orenburg) is a Russian punk-rocker He is the lead singer of the  Masochist and Nick Rock'n'Roll & Trite Dushi.

See also 

Tony Blackplait
Kuncewicz

External links 
НИК РОК-Н-РОЛЛ: К сожаленью, День Рожденья только раз в году. Или два...
Ник Рок-н-Ролл (Николай Францевич Кунцевич)
Nick Rock'n'Roll (photograph) 
Nick Rock'n'Roll (photograph)
Nick Rock'n'Roll & Trite Dushi

1960 births
Living people
Anarcho-punk musicians
Russian punk rock musicians
Nick